Étienne de La Grange (died 26 November 1388) was a French politician of the group of counselors of kings Charles V and Charles VI designated as the Marmousets by their detractors. He was the brother of Cardinal Jean de La Grange. Knighted in 1371, he was elected president of the parliament in 1373, where he was a consultant from 1369.

Of his marriage to Marie du Bois, he had a daughter named Jacqueline, married to Jean de Montaigu who served Charles VI in many functions of the state.

Sources
Le Roux de Lincy, Les femmes célèbres de l'ancienne France: mémoires historiques sur la vie publique et privée des femmes franc̜aises, depuis le cinquième siècle jusq'ua dix-huitième, Leroi (1848), p. 425.

References

Attribution
This article is based on the translation of the corresponding article of the French Wikipedia. A list of contributors can be found there at the History section.

1388 deaths
French politicians
Year of birth unknown